is Maaya Sakamoto's 6th studio album. The album is produced by various well-known composers. The first pressing came with a DVD featuring music videos for "Saigo no Kajitsu", "Triangler" and "Ame ga Furu".

Track listing

Charts

References

External links
Kazeyomi Special Page

2009 albums
Maaya Sakamoto albums
FlyingDog albums